Momlu (also Romanized as Momlū; also known as Qomlū) is a village in Beygom Qaleh Rural District, in the Central District of Naqadeh County, West Azerbaijan Province, Iran. At the 2006 census, its population was 362, in 69 families.

References 

Populated places in Naqadeh County